The 2016 Team Ice Racing World Championship was the 38th edition of the Team World Championship. The final was held on 13/14 February, 2016, in Tolyatti, Russia. Russia won their 14th consecutive title and 22nd title overall.

Final classification

See also 
 2016 Individual Ice Racing World Championship
 2016 Speedway World Cup in classic speedway
 2016 Speedway Grand Prix in classic speedway

References 

Ice speedway competitions
World